Bully is the solo project of guitarist and singer Alicia Bognanno. The American rock band formed in 2013 in Nashville. They signed to Columbia Records label Startime International and released their first album Feels Like in 2015, then moved to Sub Pop to release Losing in 2017. Their third album Sugaregg was released on August 21, 2020. What initially began as a three-piece band is now a solo project with accompanying members.

Background
Bully was founded by Rosemount, Minnesota native Alicia Bognanno, who earned a degree from Middle Tennessee State University in audio recording before getting an internship at Steve Albini's Electrical Audio studios in Chicago. She started recording demos of her own material before relocating to Nashville, Tennessee, where she worked as an engineer at Battle Tapes Recording and The Stone Fox venue. She formed the band with Stewart Copeland on drums (not to be confused with the drummer for The Police).

After self-releasing a limited cassette, the band's first single proper, "Milkman", was released in April 2014. They signed with Columbia Records label Startime International and released their debut album Feels Like in June 2015. 

Feels Like received generally positive reviews from critics. Laura Snapes of Pitchfork wrote, "The coarse Cobain head-scream of Bully singer, songwriter, and guitarist Alicia Bognanno is its own resuscitating jolt of protest... she spends much of Feels Like tearing down the house with her howl."

Losing, Bully's second studio album, was released by Sub Pop on October 20, 2017. The album was recorded at Electrical Audio in Chicago. It was called less "grimier and sugar-slick" than Feels Like.

On May 1, 2020, Bully released covers of Nirvana's "About a Girl" and Orville Peck's "Turn to Hate". Of the "About a Girl" cover, Rolling Stone stated "Hearing the Nashville band cover Nirvana is almost too obvious—but, good God, is it glorious. Their spin on 1989's 'About a Girl' strikes a perfect balance of raw and melodic, without ever sounding like the output of a cover band...Still, it's not just a skilled copy of a classic." As for her take on "Turn to Hate", Stereogum wrote "A song that sounds incredible in Bully's rocket-fueled garage rock style." Paste concurred that "Bully's rendition is possibly even better than the original with its incredibly anthemic chorus."

On June 11, 2020, Bully announced their third record Sugaregg, which was released by Sub Pop on August 21, 2020. Bognanno paid homage to Chumbawamba's 1997 song "Tubthumping" when writing the single "Where to Start", which was met with positive reception. On the album's second single "Every Tradition", Bognanno addresses society's expectations for women, while also targeting a specific unnamed individual. In an interview with the New York Times published on August 18, 2020, Bognanno discussed the record, as well her bipolar II disorder as well as the experience of Sugaregg being her first solo project.

Members
Current members 
 Alicia Bognanno – vocals, guitar, bass
 Wesley Mitchell – drums
 Nick Byrd – bass

Past members
 Clayton Parker
 Reece Lazarus
 Stewart Copeland

Discography
Bully (2014)
Feels Like (2015)
Losing (2017)
Sugaregg (2020)

References

External links

Alternative rock groups from Tennessee
Musical groups established in 2013
Musical groups from Nashville, Tennessee
Columbia Records artists
Sub Pop artists
2013 establishments in Tennessee